Mohammad Haneef Atmar (Pashto:  محمد حنیف اتمر; born 10 September 1968) is the former Minister of Foreign Affairs and a former Interior Minister of Afghanistan. He was removed from the Ministry of Interior Affairs by Hamid Karzai in the wake of attacks on the June 2010 Afghan Peace Jirga. Before that he worked with several international humanitarian organisations and served as Minister of Rural Rehabilitation and Development and Minister of Education. In 2011, he was part of the Right and Justice party. During his time in office, he has visited several countries to get funding to stabilise Afghanistan.

Atmar served as the National Security Advisor to Ashraf Ghani from 2014 to 2018, when he resigned due to disagreement with Ghani on certain issues. In late 2018, Atmar announced his candidacy for the April 2019 presidential elections, indicating he firmly believes a peace deal with the Taliban is possible. He later withdrew his candidature. On 4 April 2020, he was appointed as the acting foreign minister, and approved on a permanent basis by the Wolesi Jirga on 21 November 2020. He was sworn-in on 4 February 2021. He fled to Turkey after the fall of Kabul to the Taliban in August 2021.

Early life
Atmar was born in 1968 as son of Mohammad Asef Atmar in Laghman Province of Afghanistan. He is an ethnic Pashtun. As a young adult, he worked for the KHAD, an Afghan security and intelligence agency with strong ties to the Soviet KGB, including with a special-operations unit. During the Soviet–Afghan War he fought against Mujahids, and lost a leg defending Jalalabad in 1987. Atmar left for the United Kingdom after the fall of Kabul.

Studies and humanitarian work
In the UK he earned two degrees at the University of York: a diploma in Information Technology and Computers, and an M.A. in Public Policy, International Relations and Post-war Reconstruction studies, which he studied for from 1996 to 1997. He speaks fluent Pashto, Dari, English, Urdu, and Hindi. In 1992 Atmar began advising on Afghanistan and Pakistan for humanitarian agencies, which he would continue for two years. Following that he went to the Norwegian Church Aid, where he served as Program Manager for six years until 2001. That same year he was hired as the Deputy Director General of the International Rescue Committee for Afghanistan, but after the September 11th attacks, the 2001 U.S. invasion of Afghanistan, and the Bonn Agreement creating an Afghan Transitional Authority under Hamid Karzai, Atmar left to join the new government.

Political career

Minister of Rural Rehabilitation and Development
In 2002, Atmar was invited to join the Transitional Government as the Minister of Rural Rehabilitation & Development and was confirmed with the same portfolio in the cabinet of the newly elected President Hamid Karzai in December 2004. As one of the youngest members of cabinet and a technocrat, he directed his energies into transforming a dysfunctional and non-descript ministry into one of national significance that reached into every province of the country, overseeing an annual budget of nearly 500 million dollars at the end of his four-year tenure.

Ercan Murat, Country Director for UNDP in Afghanistan described Atmar in 2004 as a human development champion. As head of a ministry that was considered a key consumer of international funds, his task entailed providing food security for the rural population, safe drinking water, alternatives for the drug-economy and building the necessary infrastructure for the economy in rural areas to develop.

Minister of Education
In May 2006, Atmar was sworn in as the Minister of Education after being approved by an overwhelming majority of the National Assembly. 

He was a member of the Presidential Oversight Committee.

Minister of Interior

In October 2008, Atmar was sworn in as the Minister of Interior after being approved by a majority of the National Assembly.

Later career
When the Truth and Justice party was founded in 2011, he became a member of the party.

Minister of Foreign Affairs
Atmar was appointed as the acting minister of foreign affairs by President Ashraf Ghani on 4 April 2020. Ghani also nominated him as minister on permanent basis, pending approval by the National Assembly. His nomination was approved by 197 of the 246 lawmakers present in the Wolesi Jirga on 21 November, with 24 opposing, nine votes being blank and 16 being invalid. He was sworn-in on 4 February 2021.

Collapse of the Afghan government
The 2021 Taliban offensive culminated in the fall of Kabul to the Taliban. Atmar was evacuated from Afghanistan on 16 August 2021 to Turkey, alongside Turkish citizens and other Afghan officials by the Turkish government.

Because no foreign government accorded diplomatic recognition to the Taliban, diplomats appointed by the previous government continued to operate most of Afghanistan's 65 embassies abroad, which rejected Taliban demands to allow them to take control of Afghan foreign policy. In exile, Atmar continued to identify himself as Afghan foreign minister. The United Nations removed his name from its list of foreign ministers on 15 February 2022.

Works
 Development of Non-Governmental Organisations in Developing Countries
  (with Arne Strand and Sultan Barakat)
 Humanitarian Aid, War and Peace in Afghanistan: What to Learn?
 Politics and Humanitarian Aid in Afghanistan and its Aftermath for the People of Afghanistan
 Afghanistan or a Stray War in Afghanistan.
 The Challenge of Winning the Peace, chapter written together with Jonathan Goodhand. published in: Searching for Peace in Central and South Asia, 2002

References

External links

 Speech on Promoting Good Governance and Fighting Corruption in Afghanistan at the Brookings Institution

1968 births
Living people
Pashtun people
Government ministers of Afghanistan
Education ministers of Afghanistan
Foreign ministers of Afghanistan
Interior ministers of Afghanistan
Alumni of the University of York
People from Laghman Province